William Hinnegan (June 26, 1841 – April 18, 1912) was a sailor in the United States Navy during the American Civil War. He received the Medal of Honor.

Biography
Hinnegan was born in 1841 in Ireland. He emigrated to the United States as a boy and joined the US Navy from New York City.

Hinnegan was a Fireman Second Class served on board the U.S.S. Agawam, as one of a volunteer crew of powder boat which was exploded near Fort Fisher, 23 December 1864. This act earned the Medal of Honor during the Civil War.

Medal of Honor citation
Rank and organization: Fireman Second Class,  U.S.S. Agawam. Place and date: At Fort Fisher, North Carolina, 23 December 1864

Citation:

The President of the United States of America, in the name of Congress, takes pleasure in presenting the Medal of Honor to Fireman Second Class William Hinnegan, United States Navy, for extraordinary heroism in action while serving on board the U.S.S. Agawam, as one of a volunteer crew of powder boat which was exploded near Fort Fisher, North Carolina, 23 December 1864. The powder boat, towed in by the Wilderness to prevent detection by the enemy, cast off and slowly steamed to within 300 yards of the beach. After fuses and fires had been lit and a second anchor with short scope let go to assure the boat's tailing inshore, the crew again boarded the Wilderness and proceeded a distance of 12 miles from shore. Less than two hours later the explosion took place, and the following day fires were observed still burning at the forts.

See also
List of Medal of Honor recipients
List of American Civil War Medal of Honor recipients: G–L

Notes

References

External links
 Naval History and Heritage Command: Agawam I (Side Wheel Gunboat)

Union Navy sailors
United States Navy Medal of Honor recipients
American Civil War recipients of the Medal of Honor
1841 births
Irish emigrants to the United States
Irish-born Medal of Honor recipients
People from New York City
1912 deaths